St Saviour's Church is in Ringley, Kearsley, near Bolton, Greater Manchester, England. It is an active Anglican parish church in the deanery of Bolton, the archdeaconry of Bolton and the diocese of Manchester. Its benefice is united with those of St Peter's, Farnworth, St John the Evangelist, Farnworth and Holy Trinity, Prestolee. The church is recorded in the National Heritage List for England as a designated Grade II listed building.

History

The first church was built in 1625. It was replaced in 1826 by a church designed by Charles Barry. In 1850–54 this church was demolished, other than its tower, and a new church was built in a position further back from the road, leaving the tower isolated. The new church was designed by the Lancaster architects Sharpe and Paley. It is a commissioners' church, a grant of £200 having been provided by the Church Building Commissioners towards the cost of its construction. Its total cost was £2,500 (equivalent to £ in ), of which £500 was given by the 13th Earl of Derby. The church was consecrated on 10 June 1854 by the Bishop of Manchester.

Architecture

Exterior
The church is built in stone with ashlar dressings, and has a stone slate roof. Its plan consists of a five-bay nave with a clerestory, north and south aisles, a north porch and a chancel with a south vestry. At the southwest corner is an octagonal turret. The turret has a gabled buttress over which are lancet bell openings, a cornice and a spire. In the west end is a doorway over which are three tall two-light windows.

Interior
Some of the fittings were moved from the old church. These include the chancel rails in rococo style, and a communion table in the north chapel dated 1654. The stained glass in the north side of the chancel are from the 17th century. Later fittings include a reredos and sedilia in alabaster dating from 1879 containing mosaic and statues, a rood beam with figures from 1925, and an altar with a canopy in a chapel at the northwest of the church dating from 1921. Also in the church are monuments to the memory of Matthew Fletcher, owner of the Wet Earth Colliery who died in 1808, and his nephew Ellis Fletcher who died in 1834.

Separate tower

Standing in an isolated position by the road is the tower from the original church. A plaque above the door refers to its building in 1625. Another plaque refers to the addition of a vestry in 1726, and the church's rebuilding in 1826. The tower is in three stages, with entrances on the lowest stage, some of which are blocked. In the middle and upper stages are three-light mullioned windows, and above these in the top stage is a clock face on each side. Over these is a cornice and an embattled parapet with a pinnacle at each corner. The tower is a Grade II listed building.

Churchyard
The churchyard contains the war graves of six soldiers of the First World War, and two airmen, a soldier and Royal Naval Volunteer Reserve officer of the Second World War.

See also

Listed buildings in Kearsley
List of works by Sharpe and Paley
List of Commissioners' churches in Northeast and Northwest England

References

Ringley, St Saviour's Church
Grade II listed churches in the Metropolitan Borough of Bolton
Churches completed in 1854
19th-century Church of England church buildings
Gothic Revival church buildings in England
Ringley, St Saviour's Church
Ringley
Sharpe and Paley buildings
Commissioners' church buildings